Aleksandr Sergeevich Gripich (born 29 September 1986) is a Russian pole vaulter.

He finished fifth both at the 2009 World Championships and at the 2014 European Championships. He won silver medal at the 2015 European Indoor Championships. Gripich has also won gold medal at the 2009 Universiade and silver medal at the 2011 Universiade.

His personal best jump outdoor is 5.75 metres, achieved at the 2009 World Championships. His personal best jump indoor is 5.85 metres, achieved at the 2015 European Indoor Championships

Competition record

References

1986 births
Living people
Russian male pole vaulters
Universiade gold medalists in athletics (track and field)
Universiade gold medalists for Russia
Universiade silver medalists for Russia
Competitors at the 2013 Summer Universiade
Medalists at the 2009 Summer Universiade
Medalists at the 2011 Summer Universiade
World Athletics Championships athletes for Russia
Russian Athletics Championships winners